Rockville Air Force Station (ADC ID: P-53, NORAD ID: Z-63) is a closed United States Air Force General Surveillance Radar station. It was closed in 1966.

History
Rockville Air Force Station was one of twenty-eight stations built as part of the second segment of the Air Defense Command permanent radar network. Prompted by the start of the Korean War, on July 11, 1950, the Secretary of the Air Force asked the Secretary of Defense for approval to expedite construction of the permanent network. Receiving the Defense Secretary's approval on July 21, the Air Force directed the Corps of Engineers to proceed with construction.

Opened in 1951, the 782d Aircraft Control and Warning Squadron was activated on 16 April. It began operating a pair of AN/FPS-10 radars at Rockville in May 1952, and initially the station functioned as a Ground-Control Intercept (GCI) and warning station.  As a GCI station, the squadron's role was to guide interceptor aircraft toward unidentified intruders picked up on the unit's radar scopes.  In the mid / late 1950s, an AN/CPS-6B search radar was in use, according to one veteran.

During 1959 Rockville AFS joined the Semi Automatic Ground Environment (SAGE) system, feeding data to DC-07 at Truax Field, Wisconsin. After joining, the squadron was redesignated as the 782d Radar Squadron (SAGE) on 1 November 1959. The radar squadron provided information 24/7 the SAGE Direction Center where it was analyzed to determine range, direction altitude speed and whether or not aircraft were friendly or hostile.  By 1960 the original radars had been phased out and replaced by two AN/FPS-6 height-finder radars and an AN/FPS-7B search radar. On 31 July 1963, the site was redesignated as NORAD ID Z-53.

In addition to the main facility, Rockville operated an AN/FPS-18 Gap Filler site:
 Neoga, IL (P-53A) 

Rockville AFS was closed on 2 June 1966 due to budget reductions; sold to the state of Indiana and is now the Rockville Correctional Facility. Many former Air Force buildings are still in use.

Air Force units and assignments

Units
 Constituted as the 782d Aircraft Control and Warning Squadron
 Activated on 16 April 1951
 Redesignated '782d Radar Squadron=== (SAGE) on 1 November 1959
 Discontinued and inactivated on 25 June 1966

Assignments
 541st Aircraft Control and Warning Group, 16 April 1951
 30th Air Division, 6 February 1952
 4706th Air Defense Wing (later 4706th Air Defense Wing), 16 February 1953
 58th Air Division, 1 March 1956
 37th Air Division, 1 September 1958
 30th Air Division, 1 April 1959
 Chicago Air Defense Sector, 1 June 1959
 20th Air Division, 1 April-25 June 1966

See also
 List of USAF Aerospace Defense Command General Surveillance Radar Stations
 List of United States Air Force aircraft control and warning squadrons

References

 Cornett, Lloyd H. and Johnson, Mildred W., A Handbook of Aerospace Defense Organization  1946 - 1980,  Office of History, Aerospace Defense Center, Peterson AFB, CO (1980).
 Winkler, David F. & Webster, Julie L., Searching the Skies'', The Legacy of the United States Cold War Defense Radar Program,  US Army Construction Engineering Research Laboratories, Champaign, IL (1997).
 Information for Rockville AFS, IN

Installations of the United States Air Force in Indiana
Semi-Automatic Ground Environment sites
Aerospace Defense Command military installations
1951 establishments in Indiana
Military installations established in 1951
1966 disestablishments in Indiana
Military installations closed in 1966